Veligandu as a place name may refer to:
 Veligandu (Alif Alif Atoll) (Republic of Maldives)
 Veligandu (Haa Dhaalu Atoll) (Republic of Maldives)